The Ministry of Heritage, Sport, Tourism and Culture Industries (previously the Ministry of Tourism, Culture and Sport until October 2019), was created on January 18, 2010 when the Ministry of Culture and the Ministry of Tourism were combined under one ministry. Sport was added to the portfolio in 2011. It is responsible for the development of policies and programs and the operation of programs related to tourism, arts, cultural industries, heritage sectors and libraries, in Ontario. The Ministry works in partnership with its agencies, attractions, boards and commissions and the private sector to maximize the economic, cultural and social contributions of its agencies and attractions, while promoting the tourism industry and preserving Ontario's culture and heritage.

Organizational history
In the early years of Confederation, a Commissioner of Agriculture and Arts and a Bureau of Agriculture and Arts existed. "Arts", at the time however, referred to the practical application of an industrial, manufacturing, or scientific pursuit, rather than to its current meaning.

A Tourist and Publicity Bureau was set up in 1924 to promote Ontario’s attractions, especially those associated with nature and the outdoors. The bureau was initially a part of the Highways Department. In 1935, the bureau was renamed the Travel and Publicity Bureau, and was moved to Department of the Prime Minister. In 1944, the bureau moved to the Treasury Department.

In 1946, the bureau was upgrade to the Department of Travel and Publicity. At establishment, the department consisted of only approximately fifteen employees in four branches: publicity, the information, winter promotion, and development branches. In 1958, the department began taking on responsibilities for the cultural area, with the establishment of the historical branch and the transfer of the theatres branch from the Treasury Department.

In March 1964, the department restructured and renamed the Department of Tourism and Information. In April 1972 the department merged with the Department of Trade and Development to become the Ministry of Industry and Tourism.

In 1975, a standalone Ministry of Culture and Recreation was established, taking on responsibilities for cultural (transferred from the Ministry of Colleges and Universities), recreational and citizenship (transferred from the Ministry of Community and Social Services).  It took on oversight functions for key institutions such as Ontario Arts Council, Ontario Heritage Foundation, Art Gallery of Ontario, and Ontario Science Centre.

In the government restructuring in 1982, the various tourism and culture related responsibilities were distributed to the Ministry of Tourism and Recreation and the Ministry of Citizenship and Culture.  In 1987, the Ministry of Citizenship and Culture was further divided into Ministry of Citizenship and the Ministry of Culture and Communications (taking on responsibilities for communications and broadcasting from the Ministry of Transportation and Communications).

In 1993 the responsibilities for tourism and culture were united under the newly amalgamated Ministry of Culture, Tourism and Recreation. (Communications functions were transferred to the Ministry of Economic Development and Trade.)  However, those two responsibilities would be divided and re-united numerous time over the next two decades.  When the Progressive Conservatives under Mike Harris came to power in 1995, it again separated the tourism functions and culture functions, to Ministry of Economic Development, Trade and Tourism and Ministry of Citizenship, Culture and Recreation. The Ministry of Tourism again became a standalone ministry in 1999, and was reunited with the cultural functions in 2001 as Ministry of Tourism, Culture and Recreation. The two functions were divided again in 2002, and were merged again in 2010. Sport was added to the ministry's name at the cabinet reshuffle following the 2011 provincial election.

The ministry was renamed to its current name of Ministry Heritage, Sport, Tourism and Culture Industries in 2019.

Agencies
Cultural agencies overseen by the ministry include:
 Advisory Council to the Order of Ontario
Art Gallery of Ontario
 Conservation Review Board
McMichael Canadian Art Collection
Ontario Arts Council
Ontario Heritage Trust
 Ontario Honours Advisory Council
Ontario Media Development Corporation
Ontario Science Centre
Ontario Trillium Foundation
Royal Botanical Gardens
Royal Ontario Museum
Science North
Trillium Book Award
 Southern Ontario Library Service (see Ontario Public Libraries)
 Ontario Library Service North (see Ontario Public Libraries)

Tourism agencies and attractions overseen by the ministry include:
Fort William Historical Park
Huronia Historical Parks: Sainte-Marie among the Hurons and Discovery Harbour
Metro Toronto Convention Centre
Niagara Parks Commission
Ontario Place Corporation
 Destination Ontario (formerly called Ontario Tourism Marketing Partnership Corporation)
Ottawa Convention Centre
St. Lawrence Parks Commission

List of ministers

See also
Ontario Heritage Act
 For current organizational details, see INFO-GO (Ontario government office directory)

References

External links

T
Ontario
Ontario
Ontario
Ontario